John Nicolas Walton, Baron Walton of Detchant (16 September 1922 – 21 April 2016) was a British neuroscientist, academic, and life peer who sat in the House of Lords as a crossbencher.

Life

Lord Walton qualified from Durham University College of Medicine and completed his MD at Newcastle Medical School. Walton was President of the British Medical Association (BMA) from 1980 to 1982, President of the General Medical Council (GMC) 1982-89 and President of the Royal Society of Medicine from 1984 to 1986. He was also appointed second Warden of Green College, Oxford in 1983, where he stayed until 1989. Green College merged with Templeton College, Oxford in 2008 to become Green Templeton College, located on the site that was previously Green College.

Having been knighted in 1979, Walton was created a life peer on 24 July 1989 as Baron Walton of Detchant, of Detchant in the County of Northumberland and sat as a crossbencher. In 1992 he became a member of the Science and Technology Committee, leaving in 1996, returning in 1997 and leaving again in 2001. From 1993 to 1994 he was Chair of the Medical Ethics committee. He was Secretary of the Rare Diseases Group from 2009 until his death.

He was a member of the Norwegian Academy of Science and Letters. He was Patron of The Little Foundation, Honorary Life President of the Muscular Dystrophy Campaign, Vice President of Parkinson's UK and Honorary Chairman of the United Kingdom Medical Students' Association (UKMSA).

He wrote an autobiography The Spice of Life: From Northumbria to World Neurology in 1993.  It had 643 pages and, according to the review in the BMJ, “tells you absolutely everything [but] by the end of the book you really know nothing about him except that he has a colossal memory.”

Death
Lord Walton of Detchant died on 21 April 2016, aged 93.

Arms

References

External links
 Profile, hansard.millbanksystems.com
 Profile, aim25.ac.uk
 Profile, dodonline.co.uk
 Profile, brookes.ac.uk
 Profile, nationalarchives.gov.uk
 Profile, ukmsa.org
 
 

1922 births
2016 deaths
Knights Bachelor
Members of the Norwegian Academy of Science and Letters
Crossbench life peers
English neuroscientists
Alumni of Durham University College of Medicine
Alumni of Newcastle University
People educated at Spennymoor Grammar School
Presidents of the British Medical Association
Presidents of the Royal Society of Medicine
Foreign Members of the Russian Academy of Sciences
Wardens of Green College, Oxford
Life peers created by Elizabeth II